Crystalline coatings (or crystalline mirrors) represent a novel concept in the production of thin film  optical interference coatings, merging monocrystalline multilayers deposited via processes such as molecular-beam epitaxy (MBE) and metalorganic vapour-phase epitaxy (MOVPE) with microfabrication techniques including direct bonding and selective etching. Ultimately, separately grown heterostructures, primarily gallium arsenide / aluminum gallium arsenide (GaAs/AlGaAs) distributed Bragg reflectors (DBRs), are transferred to polished optical surfaces, generating high-performance single-crystal optical coatings on arbitrary, including curved, substrates.

The substrate-transferred crystalline coating process was initially published in Nature Photonics in 2013. With additional refinement, the technique is now capable of generating high-reflectivity mirrors with optical losses on par with the best  ion-beam-sputtered coatings, with optical absorption in the 1000–2000 nm spectral range demonstrated to be < 1 part-per-million (ppm) and optical scatter < 3 ppm in the best optics. Beyond the excellent achievable optical quality, there are three additional advantages of this process including:

 Significantly reduced elastic losses (at least a factor of 10 over typical amorphous interference coatings) resulting in minimal thermal noise, making such coatings promising for precision optical interferometry for optical atomic clocks and  gravitational-wave detectors such as LIGO
 The potential for ppm-levels of optical losses (absorption + scatter) in the mid-infrared spectral region
 A comparably high thermal conductivity, > 20-times higher than typical metal-oxide based coatings, making crystalline coatings promising for high-power continuous wave (CW) and quasi-CW lasers.

Owing to the low Brownian noise of crystalline coatings there have been a number of recent advancements in quantum-limited interferometry, with these mirrors being instrumental in efforts relevant to macroscopic quantum phenomena and enabling the demonstration of ponderomotive squeezing at room temperature, the broadband reduction of quantum radiation pressure noise via squeezed light injection, and the room temperature measurement of quantum back action in the audio band.

Crystalline coatings were pioneered by Garrett Cole at the Institute for Quantum Optics and Quantum Information at the Austrian Academy of Sciences and the University of Vienna, being commercialized together with Markus Aspelmeyer via the founding of Crystalline Mirror Solutions (CMS) in 2013. The technology and co-founders of CMS were awarded second prize from the Berthold Leibinger Innovationspreis in 2016. CMS was acquired by Thorlabs in December 2019 and rebranded as Thorlabs Crystalline Solutions.

References 

Thin-film optics